Sorkh Qaleh may refer to:
 Sorkh Qaleh, Kerman
 Sorkh Qaleh, North Khorasan
 Sorkh Qaleh-ye Kordha, North Khorasan Province
 Sorkh Qaleh Rural District, in Kerman Province